Henry Hynd (4 July 1900 – 1 February 1985), known as Harry Hynd, was a British Labour Party politician.

He was first elected as a Member of Parliament for Hackney Central at the 1945 General Election. He moved seats at the 1950 General Election and represented Accrington until he retired from the House of Commons at the 1966 General Election. He died in Hendon aged 84.

References

External links 
 

1900 births
1985 deaths
Labour Party (UK) MPs for English constituencies
Hackney Members of Parliament
Transport Salaried Staffs' Association-sponsored MPs
UK MPs 1945–1950
UK MPs 1950–1951
UK MPs 1951–1955
UK MPs 1955–1959
UK MPs 1959–1964
UK MPs 1964–1966
Politics of Hyndburn